Richard Edward Rainwater (June 15, 1944 – September 27, 2015) was an American investor and philanthropist. With an estimated net worth of $3 billion, he ranked 211th on the Forbes 400 in 2015.

His investing style was described as "analytically rigorous but opportunistic and Texas-sized in its audacity." Rainwater was a mentor and early backer of investors including Eddie Lampert, Roger Staubach, and David Bonderman. Between 2009 and his death in 2015, he suffered from progressive supranuclear palsy, a rare disease involving neurodegeneration. During his lifetime, Rainwater donated over $380 million to charitable causes and left nearly all of his estate to his charitable foundation.

Early life
Rainwater grew up in Fort Worth, Texas. Richard Rainwater was born in Fort Worth, Texas, in 1944. He grew up in a family of entrepreneurs and investors, and was exposed to the world of business and finance at an early age. Rainwater's father, Sam, was a successful businessman and investor, who owned a number of companies in the Fort Worth area. From a young age, Rainwater was exposed to the world of business and finance, and learned the value of hard work and determination from his father. His father started off as the owner of a wholesale grocery business and his mother was a clerk at J.C. Penney. He is of Lebanese ancestry. Rainwater graduated from R. L. Paschal High School. In 1963, he was initiated as a member of the Tau chapter of the Kappa Sigma fraternity at the University of Texas at Austin and in 1966, he graduated with a degree in mathematics. In 1996, he was recognized as Kappa Sigma Man of the Year. In 1968, he earned a Master of Business Administration from the Stanford Graduate School of Business.

Career
From 1968 to 1970, Rainwater worked for Goldman Sachs.

In 1970, Sid Bass, a classmate of Rainwater, invited him, then 26 years old, to manage the Bass family investments. From 1970 to July 1986, Rainwater served as the chief investment advisor to the Bass family. He was given $5 million to invest during his first year and managed to lose it all. Rainwater then sought a more methodical investment strategy by studying investors including Warren Buffett, Benjamin Graham, and David Dodd. Rainwater eventually transformed the Bass family fortune from $50 million into $5 billion, amassing $100 million for himself by the time he started investing his own capital in 1986.

In 1986, Rainwater joined forces with investor Sid Bass to form the investment firm Bass Brothers Enterprises. Together, they made a number of successful investments, including a stake in the Walt Disney Company.

Rainwater's investment success earned him a reputation as a savvy and successful investor, and he was often sought after for his expertise and advice. He was known for his ability to identify undervalued assets and create value through careful investment and strategic planning.

One of Rainwater's most successful investments was in the oil and gas industry. In the 1980s, he acquired a stake in the Bass family's oil and gas company, which he later sold for a significant profit. He also invested in a number of other energy companies, including Pennzoil and Diamond Offshore Drilling, and generated significant returns for his investors.

In addition to his investments in the oil and gas industry, Rainwater was also involved in real estate. He was instrumental in the development of the Las Colinas neighborhood in Irving, Texas, and helped to transform the area into a thriving business district. He was also involved in the development of other real estate projects, including the Harbor Pointe office complex in Dallas and the Lincoln Plaza.

Investments
Notable investments by Rainwater included:
 1969 - General American Oil Company
 1984 - On behalf of the Bass family, Rainwater made $400 million when Texaco bought back shares to avoid a hostile takeover.
 1984 - On behalf of the Bass family, Rainwater invested $478 million in Walt Disney Company and hired Michael Eisner to turn the company around
 1986 - Ensco (now Valaris plc)
 1988 - HCA Healthcare
 1989 - Along with Rusty Rose and George W. Bush, bought the Texas Rangers. Bush turned his initial $606,000 investment into more than $15 million.
 1989 - Acquired 20% of the Staubach Company for $1 million
 1992 - Mid Ocean Limited, a provider of casualty re-insurance
 1994 - Crescent Real Estate, 15 million square feet of office space in Houston
 1996 - Acquired control of Mesa Petroleum. In 1997, after Rainwater's wife fired T. Boone Pickens, the company merged with Parker & Parsley to form Pioneer Natural Resources
 Late 1990s - When oil was trading at $12/barrel, Rainwater invested $100 million in energy stocks and $200 million in oil futures. He saw the peak oil phenomenon as an investment opportunity after reading Beyond the Limits, a 1992 book that detailed the consequences of a rapidly growing world population. During the 1997 Asian financial crisis, Rainwater lost $400 million on paper, which prompted him to reread the book.

Personal life
Rainwater's first marriage, to his high school sweetheart, Karen, ended in divorce in October 1991, after 25 years. They had three children: Matthew, Todd, and Courtney.

In December 1991, 2 months after his divorce was finalized, Rainwater married financier Darla Moore and moved to Manhattan. At that time, he took a year off. Most of the time, he lived apart from his wife.

Rainwater often visited Canyon Ranch and acquired the spa via Crescent Real Estate. Rainwater owned a mansion in Montecito, California. He also invested in the Pebble Beach Golf Links along with Clint Eastwood.

Rainwater was a fan of The Road Less Traveled, a spiritual book by M. Scott Peck.

Rainwater was a self-described "fitness fanatic" and ran marathons. He loved motorsports and sponsored cars in competitions. He owned a souped-up 1970 Chevrolet Camaro that a professional friend would race.

George W. Bush invested along with Rainwater and Rainwater donated $100,000 to Bush for the 1994 Texas gubernatorial election. Bush was criticized for favoring policies that benefited Rainwater's investments. Rainwater also donated $100,000 to the 2010 Florida gubernatorial election campaign of Rick Scott, who oversaw HCA Healthcare, a major Rainwater investment.

In 2009, he was diagnosed with progressive supranuclear palsy, with a few years to live. Rainwater spent over $20 million on research trying to fight the disease. In 2010, he was awarded the Arbuckle Award at Stanford University. In accepting the award, he began to cry, showing the effect of his disease on his emotions. That year, he made his last public appearance. In March 2011, a court declared him incapacitated, and his youngest child, Matthew, became his legal guardian. Rainwater died on September 27, 2015.

By the time he died, Rainwater had donated more than $380 million to organizations working for the benefit of higher education, at-risk children, and research associated with neurodegeneration. He left nearly all of his estate for charitable purposes, primarily through the Rainwater Charitable Foundation. In 2019, the Rainwater Charitable awarded its two first prizes: one for outstanding innovation in neurodegenerative disease research to Dr. Michel Goedert (MRC, Cambridge, UK) and one for innovative early-career scientist to Dr. Patrick Hsu (Univ. California, Berkeley, USA). Rainwater also left $5 million to UT Austin for the study of American music. His will and testament also provided $60 million to his wife, Darla Moore.

Awards and honors
1992 - Golden Plate Award of the American Academy of Achievement
2010 - GSB Alumni Association's 2010 Arbuckle Award

References

External links 
 Rainwater Charitable Foundation

1944 births
2015 deaths
American financial businesspeople
American investors
American money managers
American billionaires
American people of Lebanese descent
People from Fort Worth, Texas
University of Texas at Austin College of Natural Sciences alumni
Stanford Graduate School of Business alumni
American investment bankers